Bodymoor Heath is a small village in the North Warwickshire district of the county of Warwickshire in England, situated on, and with a bridge over, the Birmingham and Fazeley Canal close to the much larger village of Kingsbury.

History 
Bodymoor Heath was originally a separate village but later became inclosed as a part of the parish of Kingsbury. Bodymoor Heath was the centre of a High Court of Chancery case of Barker v. Barker where it was held that the husband of a daughter who had inherited her father's lands in Bodymoor Heath, was not entitled to any dividend just through curtesy. The village later came into the ownership of the twice Prime Minister, Sir Robert Peel along with the surrounding Kingsbury parish. The village is located near the planned route of the High Speed 2 railway line. The route passes through the Bodymoor Heath Training Ground, which necessitated Aston Villa to relocate a number of their facilities and pitches away from the planned route. Bodymoor Heath has a pub. The pub is called the Dog and Doublet. It was constructed in 1786 but did not become a pub until 1835. The pub was granted grade II listed status in 1981 by English Heritage. It also has a grade II listed bridge.

Aston Villa 

Bodymoor Heath is also the home of Aston Villa Football Club's Bodymoor Heath Training Ground.  The land it was built on was purchased in the 1970s by Aston Villa's chairman Doug Ellis from a local farmer. It was redeveloped in the 1990s after criticism of under-investment by the Villa manager John Gregory.

References

External links

Villages in Warwickshire